Scarlet fever is a relatively common disease.

Scarlet Fever may also refer to:

Scarlet Fever (band)
"Scarlet Fever" (song)